This is the complete list of Pan American Games medalists in women's athletics from 1951 to 2019.

Current program

60 metres

100 metres

200 metres

400 metres

800 metres

1500 metres

3000 metres

5000 metres

10,000 metres

Marathon

80 metres hurdles

100 metres hurdles

400 metres hurdles

3000 metres steeplechase

10,000 metres walk

20km road walk

50km road walk

4 × 100 metres relay

4 × 400 metres relay

High jump

Pole vault

Long jump

Triple jump

Shot put

Discus throw

Hammer throw

Javelin throw

Pentathlon

Heptathlon

References

External links
Pan American Games medal winners up to 2003

Pan American Games
Pan American Games
Athletics